Bruno da Silva Xavier, better known simply as Bruno Xavier (born 15 August 1984, Vitória, Espírito Santo, Brazil) is a Brazilian beach soccer player who plays as a defender. He is the captain of the Brazil national team and lead the team to the 2017 World Cup title.

During the 2010s, Xavier was considered one of the world's best players, having been bestowed the title of Best Player at the 2014 Beach Soccer Stars awards ceremony, and as one of the major icons of the game. He is currently the 9th highest scorer of all time for the Brazilian national team, the highest ranked of any active player.

Career

International
Before he began his beach soccer career, Xavier originally played association football as a goalkeeper. Xavier asked to train with the Brazil national beach soccer team and when fellow international goalkeeper Mao saw his talent, he invited Xavier to train with him.

Xavier was subsequently called up to the beach soccer national team but the competition for the spot of first team goalkeeper was intense. Xavier was considered as the team's third goalkeeper and did not get an opportunity to play. Brazil's then manager, Duda, believed he was good with the ball at his feet and had potential to be a good outfield player but he would have to train as such for a year before he could play in the national team.

In 2008, aged 24, Xavier finally made his debut for Brazil, now transformed into an outfield player. He was subsequently included in Brazil's provisional squad for the 2011 World Cup, however then coach Alexandre Soares did not pick him for the final 12-man group, an extreme disappointment for Xavier. His dream of playing at the World Cup was ultimately fulfilled by Brazil's successor coach, Junior Negao, who included Xavier (now aged 29) in his final squad for the 2013 World Cup also giving him the number 8 shirt, previously worn by Negao himself. The tournament proved to be highly successful for Xavier as an individual as he claimed the Golden Boot (Highest scorer) and Silver Ball (2nd best player) awards, cementing his importance to the Brazilian national team.

In May 2014, Xavier scored a goal against Germany in a BSWW Tour event in Mexico considered to be one of the greatest beach soccer goals ever, with calls for a FIFA Puskas Award nomination.

At the inaugural Beach Soccer Stars awards in November 2014, Xavier was crowned the world's best player as voted for by fellow players and managers confirming his status as world beach soccer icon and not just to Brazil. He has subsequently been in the top three nominees for the best player award in 2015, 2017 and 2018; he was voted as part of the team of the year every year since the awards began until 2019, the only player to be so. 

Under a new coach (Gilberto Costa) and as captain, Xavier went on to lead Brazil to their first World Cup title in eight years in 2017. In the September, Xavier earned his 100th cap for Brazil; these achievements were part of a 66 match winning streak under his leadership which ended with a loss to Russia in November 2018 in which Xavier was controversially sent off in.

Xavier scored his 200th goal for Brazil in a 10–1 win over Uruguay at the South American World Cup qualifiers in May 2019.

In a huge surprise, Xavier was left out of Brazil's squad for the 2021 World Cup in Moscow. In an Instagram video, Xavier shied away from stating exactly why he had been left out of the team, but nevertheless did mention being unable to attend the World Cup qualifiers due to playing in Europe at the time, and the effects of the COVID-19 pandemic on travel, and the introduction of younger players to the squad (considering Xavier was 37 at the time of the tournament).

Club
As is typical for top beach soccer players, Xavier has played for many club sides in numerous countries. They include Vasco da Gama, Corinthians, Espírito Santo FC and Sampaio Corrêa domestically as well as Catanzaro (Italy), Terracina (Italy), Strogino (Russia), Kristall (Russia), Alanyaspor (Turkey), Barcelona (Spain), Sporting CP (Portugal), Braga (Portugal) and Falfala Kfar Qassem (Israel) in European leagues and international competitions.

Personal life
Xavier is married to Mariângela Antunes who also plays beach soccer having been introduced to the sport through her husband; the couple wed in March 2009 and have two children, Luna and Cauã.

In his home state of Espírito Santo, in Anchieta, Xavier has set up and owns the "Mission Training Center" which he established in order to "integrate young people into society through sport" as well as develop the next generation of Brazilian beach soccer players. The centre also has a focus on developing women's beach soccer. The centre has proved successful in nurturing players such as Gean Pietro and Raphael Silva who have gone on to represent the Brazilian national under-20 beach soccer team in winning the 2017 South American Under-20 Beach Soccer Championship.

Junior Negao and Juninho are his idols.

Honours
The following is a selection, not an exhaustive list, of the major honours Xavier has won:

Country
FIFA Beach Soccer World Cup (1): 2017
Beach Soccer Intercontinental Cup (3): 2014, 2016, 2017
CONMEBOL qualifiers for the FIFA Beach Soccer World Cup (2): 2015, 2017
CONMBEOL Copa América de Beach Soccer (1): 2016
South American Beach Soccer League (2): 2017, 2018
North zone regular season event (2): 2017, 2018 
Mundialito (2): 2016, 2017
South American Beach Games (2): 2011, 2014

Club
Mundialito de Clubes (5): 2011, 2013, 2015, 2019, 2020
Euro Winners Cup (4): 2014, 2015, 2017, 2019  
Copa Brasil (3): 2012, 2016, 2018
Italian Serie A (2): 2011, 2012
Russian Championships (3): 2013, 2015, 2016
Portuguese League (2): 2016, 2018
Israel League (1): 2019

Individual

FIFA Beach Soccer World Cup
Golden Ball: 2013
Silver Shoe: 2013
Beach Soccer Stars
World's best player: 2014
World dream team: 2014, 2015, 2016, 2017, 2018
Intercontinental Cup
Top scorer: 2014, 2016
Best player: 2016
CONMEBOL qualifiers
Top scorer: 2013

CONMEBOL Copa América
Best player: 2016
South American Beach Games
Top scorer: 2011
Euro Winners Cup
Best player: 2014
Serie A:
Best player: 2010

Statistics

Country

Club

References

External links
Bruno da Silva Xavier, profile at Beach Soccer Worldwide
Bruno Xavier, profile at Brazil Beach Soccer Confederation, CBSB (in Portuguese)
Bruno da Silva Xavier, profile at Beach Soccer Russia (in Russian)
Bruno Xavier, profile at zerozero.pt (in Portuguese)

1984 births
Living people
Brazilian footballers
Brazilian beach soccer players
Association football defenders